The 1964 Marshall Thundering Herd football team was an American football team that represented Marshall University in the Mid-American Conference (MAC) during the 1964 NCAA University Division football season. In its sixth season under head coach Charlie Snyder, the team compiled a 7–3 record (4–2 against conference opponents), tied for second place out of seven teams in the MAC, and outscored opponents by a total of 120 to 93. Bill Winter and Jim Cure were the team captains. The team played its home games at Fairfield Stadium in Huntington, West Virginia.

Schedule

References

Marshall
Marshall Thundering Herd football seasons
Marshall Thundering Herd football